Hari Vairavan (died 3 December 2022) was an Indian Tamil actor and comedian.

Career 
Vairavan hailed from Madurai and was known for his comedic role in Vennila Kabadi Kuzhu, where he played a member of the titular kabaddi team. He also featured in a number of other films, including Naan Mahaan Alla and Kullanari Koottam.

Death 
Vairavan died of renal failure resulting from acute diabetes on 3 December 2022. His body was cremated at his native Katachanendal in the Madurai district.

References 

20th-century births
2022 deaths
Indian actors
Tamil actors
People from Madurai